Astralium haematragum, common name the Pacific star shell, is a species of sea snail, a marine gastropod mollusk in the family Turbinidae, the turban snails.

Description
The size of the shell varies between 15 mm and 25 mm. The imperforate shell is pale ashen. It has an elevated-conic shape with an acute apex. The seven whorls are planulate above, with radiating oblique folds, which are produced into short spines at the periphery. The body whorl is carinated, with ten to twelve spines in a single series. The base of the shell is plano-concave, concentrically squamose-lirate. The aperture is transverse, channelled at the carina. The columella is arcuate, purple or blue margined, dentate at its base.

Distribution
This marine species occurs in the Southwest Pacific and off Japan.

References

 Williams, S.T. (2007). Origins and diversification of Indo-West Pacific marine fauna: evolutionary history and biogeography of turban shells (Gastropoda, Turbinidae). Biological Journal of the Linnean Society, 2007, 92, 573–592.
 Alf A. & Kreipl K. (2011) The family Turbinidae. Subfamilies Turbininae Rafinesque, 1815 and Prisogasterinae Hickman & McLean, 1990. In: G.T. Poppe & K. Groh (eds), A Conchological Iconography. Hackenheim: Conchbooks. pp. 1–82, pls 104–245.

External links
 Gastropods.com: Astralium haematragum

haematragum
Gastropods described in 1829